Florida's 2nd Senate District elects one member of the Florida Senate. The district currently consists of Bay, Calhoun, Holmes, Jackson, Walton, Washington counties and part of Okaloosa county in the U.S. state of Florida. The current Senator is Republican Jay Trumbull.

List of Senators 
NOTE: The following Information was gathered from the Florida Senate website. Only records of senators from 1998-present are kept.

Elections 
NOTE: The following results were gathered from the Florida Department of State. Uncontested election results are not provided.

1978

1986

1992

1994

2010

2018

2022

References

Florida Senate districts